George Draper may refer to:

George A. Draper (1855–1923), American textile industrialist
George W. Draper III (born 1953), judge on the Supreme Court of Missouri
George Draper (physician) (1880–1959), American physician consulted by Franklin Roosevelt on his paralysis